P., L., & B. v Minister for Justice Equality and Law Reform [2001] IESC 107, [2002] 1 ILRM 16 was an Irish Supreme Court case in which the Court ruled that refusal of an application for asylum may constitute a sufficient basis for the government to order the applicant's deportation.

Background  
All the applicants applied for asylum in the state and were refused. Each applicant appealed but was unsuccessful. The applicants then requested that the Minister for Justice exercise his discretion to allow them to remain in the state on a humanitarian basis pursuant to Section 3(3)(b) of the Immigration Act 1999.  The issue of the constitutional status of non-nationals was examined by the Supreme Court in In the Matter of Article 26 of the Constitution and Section 5 and Section 10 of the Illegal Immigrants (Trafficking) Bill 1999  [2000] 2 IR 360, 382-86, where it was decided that the State had a legitimate interest in the control of aliens. The applicants argued that the Minister had failed to provide them with an intelligible description of his reasons for his decision to deport them.

Holding of the Supreme Court 
The Supreme Court judgment was delivered by Hardiman J. The judge considered the status of the applicants at the time they made their representation to the Minister and he noted that theirs was an ad misericordiam application. The applicant did not meet any requirement in regards to their humanitarian consideration. Hardiman J noted the case of Laurentiu v. Minister for Justice, where Geoghegan J. held that the Minister's advertence to the common good may suffice to explain why humanitarian considerations were insufficient preclude deportation. Hardiman J concluded that the Minister had been, "entitled to identify, as an aspect of [the common good], the maintenance of the integrity of the asylum and immigration systems". Accordingly, the Court decided to uphold the decision of the High Court to dismiss the applications for leave to seek judicial review of the Minister's deportation order on the basis of the insufficiency of such a reason.

Further reading 

 European Court of Justice,(2008): Metock and Others v. Minister for Justice, Equality and Law Reform. 47, No. 6  pp. 862–874. 
 Rosemary Hennigan," Immigration and Citizenship Law" (2019) Hibernian Law Journal 2019, 18(1), 122-125.
 Patricia Brazil ,"Asylum and Immigration Law" (2017) Annual Review of Irish Law 2017, 1(1), 6-33.

References 

2001 in case law
Supreme Court of Ireland cases
2001 in Irish law